State Route 213 (SR 213) is the shortest state highway in the U.S. state of Washington. SR 20 Spur became SR 213 in 1973 because  was recently established in Anacortes.

Route description

Traveling northwest and turning northeast, the unsigned roadway crosses the Cascade and Columbia River Railroad and the Okanogan River near the confluence of the Okanogan River and Loup Loup Creek. An estimated daily average of 740 motorists utilized SR 213 in 2008.

History

SR 213 originated as a minor road that connected  (US 97) to the area south of the Okanogan River and Malott; the road first appeared on a map in 1954. By 1963, US 97 was realigned south of the Okanogan River and the PSH 16 branch was extended across the river. During a highway renumbering in 1964, PSH 16 became  and the branch of PSH 16 became SR 20 Spur. In 1973, SR 20 Spur became SR 213, while  was established in Anacortes. The highway between Malott and SR 20 will be eventually built as state law dictates it.

Major intersections

References

External links

Highways of Washington State

213
Transportation in Okanogan County, Washington
State highways in the United States shorter than one mile